"Titan Goes Pop" is an episode of Stingray, a British Supermarionation television series created by Gerry and Sylvia Anderson and filmed by their production company AP Films. Written by Dennis Spooner and directed by Alan Pattillo, it was the 29th episode of the series to be produced and was first broadcast on 6 December 1964 on ATV London.

The series follows the missions of the World Aquanaut Security Patrol (WASP), an organisation responsible for policing the Earth's oceans in the mid-2060s. Headquartered at the self-contained city of Marineville on the West Coast of North America, the WASP operates a fleet of vessels led by Stingray: a combat submarine crewed by Captain Troy Tempest, Lieutenant "Phones" and Marina, a mute young woman from under the sea. Stingrays adventures bring it into contact with undersea civilisations – some friendly, others hostile – as well as mysterious natural phenomena. The WASP's most powerful enemy is King Titan, ruler of the ocean floor city of Titanica.

In "Titan Goes Pop", Titan's agent X-2-Zero kidnaps a pop singer who is visiting Marineville. The episode has been positively received by commentators, who note its humour and view the premise as a parody of 1960s Beatlemania and broader pop culture. It has been called a "key episode" and a "highlight" of Stingray. The episode was included in the limited-edition Filmed in Supermarionation Blu-ray box set released in 2015.

Plot
The World Security Patrol commanders inform Commander Shore (voiced by Ray Barrett) that pop star Duke Dexter will perform at the WASP's upcoming recruiting show in Marineville. Although the commanders stress that Dexter's planned appearance is to be kept a secret, word is soon leaked to the press and Marineville is swamped by hundreds of Dexter's hysterical fans.

Surface Agent X-2-Zero (voiced by Robert Easton) has been monitoring events from his house on Lemoy Island. Wrongly inferring that Dexter is the most important person ever to visit Marineville, he reports to his master King Titan (voiced by Ray Barrett), who orders him to bring Dexter to Titanica. Disguising himself as one of Dexter's fans, X-2-Zero travels to Marineville and tricks the base personnel and the star's manager, Sandy Gibson, into thinking that he is an undercover agent called "X" who has been assigned to protect Dexter. To get Dexter into Marineville unnoticed, Gibson and Shore have Captain Troy Tempest (voiced by Don Mason) dress as him to distract the screaming crowds while the real Dexter arrives by helicopter.

Still posing as "X", X-2-Zero offers to provide Dexter with accommodation until the recruiting show. After taking Dexter to Lemoy, he knocks the singer out by drugging his meal and transfers him to Titanica by submersible. With Gibson unable to reach Dexter by telephone, Troy, Phones (voiced by Robert Easton) and Gibson travel to Lemoy in Stingray only to find that Dexter and "X" have vanished. They detect X-2-Zero's craft on Stingrays scanners but as they move to intercept, a stabiliser breaks loose, disabling Stingray.

At Titanica, Titan asks Dexter whether it is true that people go crazy when they see him. Dexter says that it is, confirming Titan's mistaken belief that Dexter is causing the "terraineans" (humans) to destroy each other and that he will make a great ally. He has Dexter drugged once more and returned to Lemoy. After being rescued by the WASP, Dexter claims that he was abducted by underwater beings, but Shore is convinced that it was all a publicity stunt.

The episode ends with Dexter at the recruiting show performing his latest hit, "I've Got Something to Shout About", to an enthusiastic audience. At Titanica, a delighted Titan and X-2-Zero watch a live broadcast of the show, confident that the craze around Dexter will facilitate their conquest of the terraineans.

Production
Although the closing titles credit the script to Alan Fennell, "Titan Goes Pop" was in fact written by Dennis Spooner. Several major scenes were cut, including one in which the WSP commanders discuss sending the letter that Commander Shore receives at the start of the episode. The deleted scenes also included a montage revealing how the press learn of Dexter's visit: besides the shot of the front page of the Marineville Observer newspaper (which was kept in), the episode would have shown a telephone switchboard with many hands switching leads, as well as telephone or radio mast wires transmitting signals.

Dexter's singing voice was provided by Gary Miller, who also performed the series' end titles song, "Aqua Marina". The song "I've Got Something to Shout About" is also heard in "Set Sail for Adventure", which was filmed immediately after this episode.

Reception
Phelim O'Neill of The Guardian calls the episode "hilarious". Simon Archer and Marcus Hearn, authors of What Made Thunderbirds Go! The Authorised Biography of Gerry Anderson, regard it as a "highlight" of Stingray. Writing for Starburst magazine, Fred McNamara names "Titan Goes Pop" a "key" episode of the series and one of eight "essential episodes" of Supermarionation. Describing it as a "wry parody of Beatlemania", he sums up the episode as one "that highlights Stingrays approach to comedy", adding that the voice cast "are given ample material to play with in Fennell's sharp disdain of celebrity culture." McNamara finds the story especially funny for Titan believing that the devotion of Duke Dexter's fans can be used as a weapon against human civilisation.

Ian Fryer, author of The Worlds of Gerry and Sylvia Anderson: The Story Behind International Rescue, considers "Titan Goes Pop" to be the series' "key episode" as well as its "funniest" instalment, describing the story as a "fascinating and wildly entertaining spoof of the phenomenon of the pop superstar". He comments that Dexter's presence in Marineville provides "some great jokes" while the exchanges between Titan and X-2-Zero boast "some of the best dialogue in the entire series". On the closing scene, Fryer writes that Titan and X-2-Zero's clueless reactions to Dexter's performance "[echo] some of the fears of the more apocalyptic commentators of the '50s and '60s at the effects of popular culture on society." He compares the physical appearance of the Dexter puppet to that of Elvis Presley and the character's vocal style to that of Buddy Holly or Adam Faith.

Vincent Law regards the episode as a parody of teen culture. Comparing the premise to Beatlemania "in its hysterical early days", Paul O'Brien comments that Dexter's appearances "brilliantly mimic Elvis Presley's effect on late '50s audiences" and argues that Shore and Titan represent "the older generation's incomprehension" of contemporary pop culture. He notes that as the regular characters had been "well established with the viewers", Spooner was "able to have some fun" lampooning them. O'Brien also praises the scale model work but describes the projection shots of the disguised Troy running away from Dexter's hysterical fans as a "total failure", remarking that it "looks like the puppet is being stretched on a rack."

In an otherwise positive review of Stingrays soundtrack, Anthony Clark of sci-fi-online.com criticises "I've Got Something to Shout About", calling the song "truly dreadful" and "best skipped".

References

External links

1964 British television episodes
Parody television episodes
Science fiction television episodes
Stingray (1964 TV series)
Television episodes about abduction
Television episodes set on fictional islands